Slovenia first participated as an independent nation at the Olympic Games at the 1992 Winter Olympics in Albertville, France, and the country has sent athletes to compete at every Games since then. The Slovenian Olympic Committee was established in 1991 and was recognised by the International Olympic Committee on 5 February 1992.

Slovenian athletes first competed at the Olympics in Stockholm, at the 1912 Summer Olympics, as part of the Austrian team. There, Rudolf Cvetko became the first Slovene to win an Olympic medal, a silver in the men's team sabre. Then, until Slovenia's independence, they competed as part of Yugoslavia. Before the Second World War, all of the Olympic medals for the Kingdom of Yugoslavia were won by Slovene gymnasts (with the exception of Croatian Dragutin Ciotti who was a member of the bronze medal winning men's gymnastics all-around team at the 1928 Summer Olympics). Leon Štukelj was the most prominent pre-war athlete, winning three gold, one silver, and two bronze medals, and he is still the most decorated Slovenian Olympian. Among post-war Olympians, Miroslav Cerar won two gold and one bronze medals, also in gymnastics. All of Yugoslavia's Winter Olympic medals (three silver and one bronze) were won by Slovenians with the first being the silver medal of Jure Franko in alpine skiing, won at the 1984 Winter Olympics in Sarajevo, when Yugoslavia hosted the Games.

Athletes representing Slovenia have won a total of 28 medals at the Summer Olympic Games and another 24 at the Winter Olympic Games. Slovenia's most successful Summer Olympics have been the 2020 Summer Olympics where they won three gold medals and five medals overall. The most successful winter games were the 2014 Winter Olympics, where Slovenian athletes won a record eight medals, including two gold. Tina Maze (alpine skiing), Peter Prevc (ski jumping), and Iztok Čop (rowing) are the most decorated post-independence Slovenian Olympians, with four medals each. The shooter Rajmond Debevec has competed at the Olympics eight times . He competed between 1984 and 2012, representing Yugoslavia for his first two appearances. Track and field athlete Merlene Ottey competed at the Olympics seven times between 1980 and 2004. In her first six appearances, she was representing Jamaica, for whom she won nine medals, the seventh time she represented Slovenia. Debevec is the oldest medallist and the oldest Slovenian participant at the Olympics, having won his last medal at the age of 49 in 2012. The youngest participant from Slovenia was Nastja Govejšek, a swimmer, who was 15 at the 2012 games. The youngest Olympic medallist for Slovenia has been alpine skier Alenka Dovžan, who was 18 years old when she competed at the 1994 Winter Olympics.    
Slovenian athletes have won medals in nine sports at the Summer and in five sports at the Winter Games. The most successful sport for Slovenia at the Summer Olympics is judo with six medals (two gold) while the most successful sport at the Winter Olympics is alpine skiing with eight medals (two gold). In team sports, the national teams have participated three times in handball, twice in ice hockey and once in basketball. With a population of just above 2 million, Slovenia often finds itself among countries with the highest medal-per-capita rankings.

Medal tables

Medals by Summer Games

Medals by Winter Games

Medals by summer sport

Medals by winter sport

List of medalists

Summer Olympics

Winter Olympics

Multiple medal winners

This list only contains Olympic medal winners for Slovenia as an independent country. Two medalists for Slovenia also won medals competing under different flags: Sadik Mujkić won a bronze at the 1988 Summer Olympics for Yugoslavia and Jakov Fak won a bronze at the 2010 Winter Olympics for Croatia.

List of pre-independence Slovenian medalists
This list contains Olympic medals won by Slovenian athletes before Slovenia started to participate as an independent country in 1992. The list includes both athletes who won individual medals and athletes who won medals as part of the team. Rudolf Cvetko won a medal as a member of Austrian team. All other athletes won medals for Yugoslavia, which corresponded to Kingdom of Yugoslavia for the Games from 1920 to 1936 and Socialist Federal Republic of Yugoslavia from 1948 to 1988. Stojna Vangelovska, a Macedonian basketball player who won silver with women's team at the 1988 Seoul Olympics, and Vinko Jelovac, a basketball player born in Croatia who won silver with men's team at the 1976 Montreal Olympics, are sometimes included to lists of Slovenian medalists. Both spent important parts of their careers playing for Slovenian clubs. Vangelovska played at Ljubljana's ŽKD Ježica  and Jelovac at Ljubljana's KK Olimpija. Jelovac was also twice chosen as Slovenian Sportsman of the Year in the 1970s. After the breakup of Yugoslavia, handball player Iztok Puc first played for the Croatian men's team, winning gold at the 1996 Summer Olympics, and later for Slovenian national team, thus becoming the only handball player to have represented three different teams at the Olympics.

Summer Olympics

Winter Olympics

See also
 List of flag bearers for Slovenia at the Olympics
 :Category:Olympic competitors for Slovenia
 Slovenia at the Paralympics

References

External links